Candida lusitaniae is a species of yeast in the genus Candida.

Candida lusitaniae was first identified as a human pathogen in 1979.

Candida lusitaniae was initially described as a rare cause of fungemia, with fewer than 30 cases reported between 1979 and 1990.  However, there has been a marked increase in the number of recognized cases of candidemia due to this organism in the last two decades.  Bone marrow transplantation and high-dose cytoreductive chemotherapy have both been identified as risk factors for infections with this organism.
These patients are often neutropenic for extended periods of time, leaving them susceptible to bacterial and fungal infections, including Candidal infections. Some investigators have theorized that the widespread use of Amphotericin B empiric antifungal therapy selects for infections with Candida lusitaniae.

References

Yeasts
lusitaniae